Sander Arends and Tristan-Samuel Weissborn were the defending champions but only Weissborn chose to defend his title, partnering Antonio Šančić. Weissborn successfully defended his title after defeating Teymuraz Gabashvili and Lukáš Lacko 7–5, 6–7(5–7), [10–7] in the final.

Seeds

Draw

References

External links
 Main draw

Open de Rennes - Doubles
2020 Doubles